Károly Honfi (October 25, 1930 in Budapest – August 14, 1996 in Budapest) was a Hungarian chess player who held the chess title of International Master. Honfi was posthumously awarded the title of Grandmaster.

Biography
Honfi was born in Budapest on October 25, 1930. His father was also a successful chess player. He was the vice champion of Hungary in 1958, and became an International Master in 1962. He earned the Correspondence Chess International Master title in 1991.

References

External links
 
 
 
 

1930 births
1996 deaths
Hungarian chess players
Chess grandmasters
Sportspeople from Budapest
20th-century chess players